Jeffrey Dale Liefer (born August 17, 1974) is an American former Major League Baseball (MLB) outfielder and first baseman who played for the Chicago White Sox, Montreal Expos, Tampa Bay Devil Rays, Milwaukee Brewers, and Cleveland Indians between 1999 and 2005.

Career
A native of Fontana, California, Liefer attended Upland High School and California State University, Long Beach. In 1995, he played collegiate summer baseball with the Chatham A's of the Cape Cod Baseball League. He was drafted in the first round of the 1995 MLB Draft by the Chicago White Sox. Liefer has played for the White Sox, Montreal Expos, Tampa Bay Devil Rays, Milwaukee Brewers, and the Cleveland Indians.

He played for the Seibu Lions of the Nippon Professional Baseball (NPB) during the - seasons. Liefer signed a minor league contract with the Chicago White Sox on January 12, but retired in June.

Notability
Liefer was once stuck in the bathroom during a minor league game. Liefer said he went to the bathroom during the game and when he wanted to come out the handle was stuck. It delayed the game 20 minutes. This produced the semi-famous quote, "I don't want to be remembered as the guy who got stuck in the bathroom".(Story)

Liefer attended and played baseball for Long Beach State where he currently holds several records, including home runs and RBIs.

References

External links

ESPN.com profile
MLB.com profile

1974 births
Living people
American expatriate baseball players in Canada
American expatriate baseball players in Japan
Baseball players from California
Birmingham Barons players
Buffalo Bisons (minor league) players
Calgary Cannons players
Charlotte Knights players
Chatham Anglers players
Chicago White Sox players
Cleveland Indians players
Durham Bulls players
Indianapolis Indians players
Long Beach State Dirtbags baseball players
Major League Baseball first basemen
Major League Baseball left fielders
Major League Baseball right fielders
Major League Baseball third basemen
Milwaukee Brewers players
Montreal Expos players
Nippon Professional Baseball first basemen
Prince William Cannons players
Seibu Lions players
South Bend Silver Sox players
Tampa Bay Devil Rays players
Anchorage Glacier Pilots players